Don Quixote is a 2015 American adventure drama film starring Carmen Argenziano, Horatio Sanz, Luis Guzman, James Franco, Lin Shaye and Reinaldo Zavarce.  It is based on the novel of the same name by Miguel de Cervantes.

Cast
Carmen Argenziano as Don Quixote
Horatio Sanz as Sancho Panza/Narrator
Luis Guzmán as Farmer
James Franco as Pasamonte
Lin Shaye as The Grand Lady
Vera Cherny as Dulcinea
Lorena McGregor as Antonia
Anthony Skordi as Father Nicolas
Reinaldo Zavarce as Miguel

References

External links
 
 

2015 films
American adventure films
Films based on Don Quixote
2010s adventure films
2010s English-language films
2010s American films